The Imaginary Baron (German: Der Juxbaron) is a 1927 German silent comedy film directed by Willi Wolff and starring Reinhold Schünzel and Marlene Dietrich. It was made at the Tempelhof Studios in Berlin. The film's sets were designed by the art director Ernst Stern.

Cast
In alphabetical order
 Karl Beckmann 
 Henry Bender as Hugo Windisch  
 Teddy Bill as Hans v. Grabow  
 Colette Brettel as Hilde v. Grabow  
 Marlene Dietrich as Sophie, ihre Tochter  
 Heinrich Gotho as Gast im Hause  
 Karl Harbacher as Stotter-Wilhelm  
 Trude Hesterberg as Fränze  
 Fritz Kampers as Polizist  
 Albert Paulig as Baron v. Kimmel  
 Hermann Picha as Landstreicher  
 Reinhold Schünzel as Der Juxbaron 
 Julia Serda as Zerline

References

Bibliography
 Grange, William. Cultural Chronicle of the Weimar Republic. Scarecrow Press, 2008.

External links 
 

1927 films
Films of the Weimar Republic
German drama films
German silent feature films
1927 drama films
Films directed by Willi Wolff
UFA GmbH films
Films based on operettas
Films shot at Tempelhof Studios
German black-and-white films
Silent drama films
1920s German films
1920s German-language films